The 2022–23 Arizona State women's basketball team represented Arizona State University during the 2022–23 NCAA Division I women's basketball season. The Sun Devils are led by first-year head coach Natasha Adair and they play their home games at the Desert Financial Arena and compete as members of the Pac-12 Conference.

Previous season
The Sun Devils finished the season 12–14, 4–9 in Pac-12 play to finish in ninth place. They lost in the first round of the Pac-12 women's tournament to Oregon. On March 3, 2022 Charli Turner Thorne announce her retirement after 25 seasons at Arizona State and 28 seasons as a head coach. She would finish with a 28 year record of 528–334.

Offseason

Departures 
Due to COVID-19 disruptions throughout NCAA sports in 2020–21, the NCAA announced that the 2020–21 season would not count against the athletic eligibility of any individual involved in an NCAA winter sport, including women's basketball. This meant that all seniors in 2020–21 had the option to return for 2021–22.

Incoming

Recruiting

Roster

Schedule

|-
!colspan=12 style=| Non-conference regular season

|-
!colspan=12 style=| Pac-12 regular season

|-
!colspan=12 style=| Pac-12 Tournament

Source:

Rankings

*The preseason and Week 1 polls were the same.^Coaches did not release a Week 2 poll.

See also
2022–23 Arizona State Sun Devils men's basketball team

References

Arizona State Sun Devils women's basketball seasons
Arizona State
Arizona State Sun Devils women's basketball
Arizona State Sun Devils women's basketball